Maria Gorczyńska (27 January 1899 – 23 June 1959) was a Polish stage and film actress. She appeared in fifteen films between 1924 and 1952.

Selected filmography
 The Unspeakable (1924)
 Co mój mąż robi w nocy? (1934)
 Pieśniarz Warszawy (1934)
 Second Youth (1938)
 Ostatnia brygada (1938)
 Youth of Chopin (1952)

References

External links

1899 births
1959 deaths
Polish film actresses
Actors from Lublin
20th-century Polish actresses
Polish stage actresses
Polish silent film actresses
Warsaw Uprising insurgents
Burials at Powązki Cemetery
Commanders of the Order of Polonia Restituta
Women in World War II